Structure & Cosmetics is the third album by New Zealand band The Brunettes, and their first album to be released on Sub Pop in the USA. The album was released on 30 July 2007 in New Zealand on Lil' Chief Records and on August 7, 2007 in North America.

Track listing
 "Brunettes Against Bubblegum Youth (B-A-B-Y)" - 4:15
 "Stereo (Mono Mono)" - 5:03
 "Her Hairagami Set" - 4:39
 "Credit Card Mail Order" - 4:11
 "Obligatory Road Song" - 4:12
 "Small Town Crew" - 3:52
 "If You Were Alien" - 4:28
 "Wall Poster Star" - 3:34
 "Structure & Cosmetics" - 4:34

Personnel
 Heather Mansfield - vocals, organ, piano, clarinet, melodica, glockenspiel, harmonica
 Jonathan Bree - vocals, guitars, bass, synthesizers, drums, rhodes, mellotron
 James Milne - backing vocals and bass on tracks 1, 3, 4, 7 and 9
 Ryan McPhun - backing vocals and drums on tracks 1, 3, 4, 7 and 9
 Harry Cundy - trumpet
 Jamie Power - drums on tracks 6 and 8.
 William Cotton - backing vocals, tenor saxophone, celeste
 Dionne Taylor - lapsteel

References

External links
New Zealand Herald article on Structure & Cosmetics
Lil' Chief Records: The Brunettes
Lil' Chief Records
The Brunettes on MySpace

2007 albums
The Brunettes albums
Lil' Chief Records albums
Sub Pop albums